London Stansted Airport  is a tertiary international airport serving London, England, United Kingdom.

London Stansted serves over 160 destinations across Europe, Asia and Africa. Stansted is a base for a number of major European low-cost carriers, being the largest base for low-cost airline Ryanair, with over 100 destinations served by the airline. As of 2022, it is the fourth-busiest airport in the United Kingdom after Heathrow, Gatwick, and Manchester. Interestingly though, during the pandemic in 2021 it was the second largest in the country. Stansted's runway is also used by private companies such as the Harrods Aviation, Titan Airways, and XJet terminals, which are private ground handlers that are able to handle private flights, charter flights, and state visits.

Converted to civil use from  RAF Stansted Mountfitchet in the late 1940s, Stansted was used by charter airlines. It came under British Airports Authority control in 1966. The privatised
BAA sold Stansted in February 2013 to Manchester Airports Group  as a result of a March 2009 ruling by the Competition Commission against BAA's monopoly position.

Overview
London Stansted Airport is located near the village of Stansted Mountfitchet. It has one main passenger terminal. Three passenger satellites have departure gates; one is connected to the main terminal by an air bridge and the other two by the Stansted Airport Transit System people mover.

The terminal building was designed by Foster and Partners with input from structural engineer Peter Rice,  and features a "floating" roof, supported by a space frame of inverted-pyramid roof trusses, creating the impression of a stylised swan in flight. The base of each truss structure is a "utility pillar", which provides indirect uplighting illumination and is the location for air-conditioning, water, telecommunications, and electrical outlets. The layout of the airport was originally designed to provide an unobstructed flow for passengers to arrive at the short-stay car park, move through the check-in hall, and go through security and on to the departure gates, all on the same level.

From 1997 to 2007, Stansted had rapid expansion of passenger numbers on the back of the boom in low-cost air travel, peaking at 24 million passengers in the 12 months to October 2007, but passenger numbers declined in the next five years. Passenger totals later increased, and in 2016 recorded an annual increase of 8.0% to 24.3 million, and numbers have since continued to rise.

History

Second World War

The airfield opened in early July 1943 a dedication ceremony for the Stansted Airfield with a parade of builders, the 825th Engineer Aviation Battalion EAB and the 850th Engineer Aviation Battalion EAB of the United States Army along with a small group of the British Royal Engineers who offered to help and wanted to learn how to operate the heavy construction equipment.   and was used during the Second World War as RAF Stansted Mountfitchet by the Royal Air Force and the United States Army Air Forces as a bomber airfield and as a major maintenance depot. Although the official name was Stansted Mountfitchet, the base was known as simply Stansted in both written and spoken form.

The station was first allocated to the USAAF Eighth Air Force in August 1942 as a heavy-bomber airfield. As well as an operational bomber base, Stansted was also an Air Technical Services Command  maintenance and supply depot concerned with major overhauls and modification of B-26s. After D-Day, these activities were transferred to France, but the base was still used as a supply storage area for the support of aircraft on the continent.

Postwar use
After the withdrawal of the Americans on 12 August 1945, Stansted was taken over by the Air Ministry and used by No. 263 Maintenance Unit, RAF, for storage purposes. In addition, between March 1946 and August 1947, Stansted was used for housing German prisoners of war.

In November 1946, the recently established British cargo airline, London Aero and Motor Services, equipped with ex-RAF Handley Page Halifaxes, moved into Stansted, using it as a base for its operations until it was wound up in July 1948.

The Ministry of Civil Aviation finally took control of Stansted in 1949 and the airport was then used as a base by several UK charter airlines. The US military returned in 1954 to extend the runway for a possible transfer to NATO. The transfer to NATO was never realised, however, and the airport continued in civil use, ending up under BAA control in 1966.

During the 1960s, '70s, and early '80s, the Fire Service Training School  was based on the eastern side of the airfield under the auspices of the Ministry of Transport and Civil Aviation, now the Civil Aviation Authority. The school was responsible for the training of all aviation fire crews for British airfields, as well as those of many overseas countries.

Commercial operations and redevelopment

Beginning in 1966, after Stansted was placed under BAA control, the airport was used by holiday charter operators wishing to escape the higher costs associated with operating from Heathrow and Gatwick.

Stansted had been held in reserve as a third London airport since the 1950s. However, after a public inquiry at Chelmsford in 1966–67, the government set up the Roskill Commission to review the need afresh. The Commission for the Third London Airport (the "Roskill Commission") of 1968–71 did not include Stansted as one of its four short-listed sites and recommended that Cublington in Buckinghamshire should be developed as London's third airport. However, the Conservative government under Ted Heath agreed with a minority recommendation that a site at Foulness in the Thames Estuary, later renamed Maplin, should be developed, but in 1974, the incoming Labour government under Harold Wilson cancelled the Maplin project because of the economic situation.

Stansted was then considered as an option for long-term development in the Advisory Committee on Airports Policy  and the Study Group on South East Airports  and was selected from a short list of six by the Conservative government in December 1979. The proposal, for a new terminal associated with the existing runway and the safeguarding of land for a second runway, was considered at the Airports Inquiries of 1981–83. The Inspector's Report was published in 1984 and the decision, announced in a white paper in 1985, was to approve a plan to develop Stansted in two phases, involving both airfield and terminal improvements that would increase the airport's capacity to 15 million passengers per year, but to reject the second runway.

Foster + Partners terminal
The current terminal building was designed by architectural practice Foster + Partners, commissioned in 1981. As part of the development, a railway branch was built to the airport, and Stansted Airport railway station opened in 1991. Construction was undertaken by John Laing and took place between 1988 and 1991, costing £100 million. In 1990, it was awarded the European Union Prize for Contemporary Architecture / Mies van der Rohe Award. The building, recognised as a landmark work of high-tech architecture, was opened to the public in 1991. 

As part of the project's development, in 1988 Norman Foster and British architectural artist Brian Clarke made several proposals for an integral artwork for the terminal building. The principal proposal would have seen the east and west elevations of the terminal clad in two sequences of traditionally mouth-blown, leaded stained glass, along the full 162-metre length of the building. However, for technical and security reasons, the artwork was not executed. In 1991, the British Airports Authority commissioned a second, smaller stained glass project from Clarke for Stansted Airport in place of the 1988 proposal. The artist designed two stained glass friezes and a 6-metre high tower of stained glass for a circulation area in the centre of the terminal which, in their composition, echoed elements of Foster's structure; by 1994 the tower had been removed to 'allow greater flow of traffic through the space', and later the friezes were likewise removed.

Recent expansions

In November 2006, Uttlesford District Council rejected a BAA planning application to increase the permitted number of aircraft movements and to remove the limit on passenger numbers. BAA immediately appealed against the decision and a public inquiry opened, lasting from May until October 2007. Planning Inspector Alan Boyland made his recommendations in January 2008.  Those recommendations were largely followed by the Secretary of State for Transport (Geoff Hoon) and the Secretary of State for Communities and Local Government (Hazel Blears), who jointly allowed the applicant's appeal in October 2008. A legal challenge by community campaign group Stop Stansted Expansion  was rejected by the High Court in March 2009.

In 2008, 57 people were arrested after Plane Stupid, an environmental activist group, broke through the barriers and created a "stockade" on a taxiway, which resulted in 52 flights being cancelled.

The Competition Commission ruled in March 2009 that BAA should sell Gatwick and Stansted Airports within two years. The ruling was quashed within a year following an appeal, but was subsequently upheld. The Competition Commission reconfirmed its ruling in July 2011 that the airport be sold, and the Court of Appeal turned down an appeal by BAA on 26 July 2012. In light of the result, BAA chose not to appeal to the Supreme Court of the United Kingdom and confirmed on 20 August 2012 that the airport would be sold.

In 2017, Antonov Airlines opened a UK office at Stansted for cargo charter flights, generally of outsize loads.

In March 2018, a group of activists delayed a deportation flight to Nigeria. 15 of the protestors were found guilty of "intentional disruption of services at an aerodrome", under the Aviation and Maritime Security Act 1990. This verdict on the Stansted 15 was described in New Statesman as having a chilling effect on public dissent.

Infrastructure

Terminal and satellite buildings
The terminal is separated into three areas: Check-in and main concourse along the front, Departures towards the back left, and Arrivals on the back right upon entry. No gates are in the main terminal building; instead, they are located in three separate oblong satellite buildings. The airport has 68 gates: 40 jetway gates, and 28 hardstands with 6 additional spaces for narrowbody planes to be stored; these spaces however inhibit the 2 spaces these storage spaces are flanked by.

An additional building, known as the Advanced Passenger Vehicle (APV), was brought back into use in 2016 for flights departing during the busy 06:00 to 08:00 am period. The APV building is linked to the main terminal building by an accessible route and acts as a bus terminal for international flights at remote stands. Prior to the completion of Satellite 3, this terminal (then consisted of gates 90–95) was in regular passenger use.

Domestic arrivals (from the UK and Common Travel Area) use a separate exit route, located at the opposite end of the Terminal to the International arrivals hall. This exit is connected solely by footbridge from Satellite 2 gates 81–88. When a domestic flight arrives at a gate which is not located in Satellite 2, passengers are transported to a gate on Satellite 2 by a courtesy bus service from the aircraft.

Car parks and hotels

Stansted has a variety of car parking including long-, mid-, and short-stay options along with valet and meet-and-greet parking services. Two drop off areas also are available. The express area is located near the short-stay car park, while a free service is within the mid-stay area. A fee is charged for the express service. Terminal Road North and its free drop-off area directly outside the terminal was closed shortly after MAG took over the airport in 2013. Since 2004, Stansted also offers a range of hotel accommodation including Holiday Inn Express, Novotel, Premier Inn, and Radisson Blu hotels and the recently opened Hampton by Hilton, the last two of which are both within two minutes of the terminal building via an undercover walkway. Regular bus service handles transfers between the terminal building and Stansted's car parks and hotels.

Control tower

Stansted's air traffic control tower was completed in 1996 and was the tallest in Britain at the time of its construction. It is located on the southside of the airfield alongside the main terminal building. It replaced the old control tower, which offered poor views of the airfield once the current terminal building was opened in 1991.

Other infrastructure
There are several cargo buildings and hangars around the airfield. The main cargo centre is located by the control tower and handles most cargo operations, including aircraft such as the McDonnell Douglas MD-11 and the Boeing 747. There are a small number of hangars on the other side of the runway to the rest of the airport. The largest are located at the south east of the airfield, one of which is used by Ryanair.

Titan Airways has its head office in the Enterprise House on the airport property. Several airlines at one time had their head offices on the airport property. AirUK (later KLM uk) had its head office in the Stansted House. When Buzz existed, its head office was in the Endeavour House. When AB Airlines existed, its head office was in the Enterprise House. For a period Lloyd International Airways had its head office at the Lloyd House at Stansted. When Go Fly existed its head office was at the Enterprise House.

Proposed developments

Abandoned plans for a second runway
This would have been the subject of a public inquiry, and if approved, would have allowed Stansted to handle more passengers than Heathrow did at the time of the application.

In May 2010, BAA withdrew its plans to build a second runway at Stansted and withdrew the plans to build a new runway at Heathrow.

The ATWP had anticipated that a second runway would be operational by 2011, but this date continued to slip. BAA's 2008 planning application envisaged operation commencing in 2015, and in 2009, BAA revised the anticipated opening date to 2017.

Prior to the United Kingdom's May 2010 general election, all three major political parties pledged not to approve a second runway. Soon after the election, the new government confirmed this, and BAA withdrew its application for planning permission, having spent nearly £200 million preparing for the public inquiry and buying up properties.

The public inquiry into BAA's second runway application had been scheduled to start on 15 April 2009, but the start was delayed by Secretary of State Hazel Blears to allow time for BAA and the government to consider the implications of the March 2009 Competition Commission's ruling that BAA must sell Stansted within two years. As 2011 drew to a close, BAA was still appealing against the Competition Commission ruling. On 20 August 2012, after losing a case at the Court of Appeal, BAA agreed to cease challenging the Competition Commission's ruling and to sell Stansted.

On 10 February 2010, Secretary of State John Denham, in an open letter, concluded that the inquiry could not reasonably start until after the general election. In addition, he commented that the planning application documents were nearly two years old and would require updating. Eventually, BAA realised the futility of pursuing its G2 application in the context of the new government policy and withdrew it on 24 May 2010.

Stop Stansted Expansion
The advocacy group Stop Stansted Expansion (SSE) was formed in 2002, as a working group of the North West Essex and East Herts Preservation Association, in response to the Government's consultation on expanding UK airports and, particularly, expansion plans for Stansted Airport subsequently defined in the Air Transport white paper in December 2003.

SSE, whose membership includes the majority of local parish councils and thousands of residents, continues to actively campaign against unsustainable expansion of the airport. SSE was a major participant in the 2007 G1 public inquiry and had committed to be a major participant in the anticipated inquiry into the G2 second runway proposal. Following the withdrawal of the G2 planning application, the group called upon BAA to sell the homes it had bought to support the planned expansion.

In September 2012, as a result of pressure from the aviation industry, the government set up the Airports Commission, chaired by Sir Howard Davies, to consider what, if anything, needed to be done to maintain the UK's status as a global aviation hub. The commission concluded that an additional runway would be required for South East England and that it should be added to either Heathrow or Gatwick. Following the 2015 election, the commission made a final recommendation to expand Heathrow subject to certain environmental constraints.

Throughout 2013, the Airports Commission published discussion papers and invited submissions from key stakeholders on the main issues it wished to consider. SSE made several thorough submissions. SSE also accepted an invitation to give oral evidence and make a presentation to the commission on aviation demand forecasting and connectivity at a public evidence session held in Manchester in July 2013.

Terminal redevelopment
MAG announced on 20 June 2013 as part of a visit to the airport by the Secretary of State for Transport that it would be launching an £80 million terminal redevelopment programme. MAG has invested £40 million and the remainder was invested by other commercial partners. The redevelopment included relocation of the security area, doubling the amount of seating, and improving the information displays. The new Departure Lounge offers a food court, a number of new shops, and an Escape Lounge, but the remodelling has drawn heavy criticism due to the length of time it takes to walk through the shopping areas to get to the departure gates.

Satellite One has also been redeveloped with the aim to attract more long-haul airlines to Stansted.

New arrivals terminal
An arrivals terminal is planned to be built at Stansted. The site is planned to include larger immigration and baggage reclaim areas, with more shops and facilities available after arrival into the UK. The current terminal will be reconfigured to departures only, with security and check-in areas due to be expanded. The project is expected to cost £130m, and, once completed, will make London Stansted the only airport in the UK with dedicated arrivals and departures terminal buildings. Initially construction was due to start in 2018, taking three years to complete. However, the arrivals terminal was put on hold at the end of 2019. In 2020, an initial decision by Uttlesford District Council refused permission for a modified version of the plan. However, this decision was overturned by the Planning Inspectorate following a public inquiry in 2021 and permission has now been granted for the airports expansion plan.

Airlines and destinations

Passenger
The following airlines operate regular scheduled flights to and from London-Stansted:

Cargo

Route Development 
Long-haul scheduled services commenced in the early 1990s when American Airlines operated a transatlantic service between Stansted and Chicago–O'Hare, but the route was unprofitable and was withdrawn in 1993. Continental Airlines also operated services in the late 1990s from Newark Liberty International Airport, but this service was stopped shortly after the September 11 attacks in 2001.

Long-haul services to the United States returned in late 2005, when Eos Airlines and MAXjet Airways commenced all-business class services from Stansted to New York–JFK. In 2006, MAXjet expanded their service with flights to Washington–Dulles, Las Vegas, and Los Angeles. American Airlines began daily flights to Stansted in October 2007 from New York–JFK and was originally expected to operate a second daily flight from April 2008. However, because of the jump in fuel price, weakening economic performance, and worsening credit environment at the time, all three services to the United States have since been discontinued following the demise of MAXjet Airways in December 2007 and Eos Airlines in April 2008. Finally, in July 2008, American Airlines withdrew from Stansted, alongside its services to Gatwick, and consolidated all operations at Heathrow Airport.

Long-haul transatlantic operations made a brief return to Stansted in June 2010, when Sun Country Airlines announced a seasonal weekly service from Stansted to Minneapolis/St. Paul. The flights made a refuelling stopover in Gander, Newfoundland and Labrador as the aircraft used for the flight, a Boeing 737-800, would not be able to complete a nonstop westbound flight from Stansted to Minneapolis. The flights operated from 11 June to 15 August 2010. In 2011, Sun Country operated to Gatwick rather than Stansted and  then discontinued flights due to the price involved in carrying fuel on long-haul flights. .
Long-haul services to Asia commenced in March 2009 with Malaysian low-cost airline AirAsia X providing direct flights to Kuala Lumpur International Airport; however, on 24 October 2011, this service moved to Gatwick Airport before being later withdrawn completely. Low-cost airline Primera Air launched non-stop flights from Stansted to Boston, Newark and Washington, D.C., until the collapse of the airline meant the discontinuation of the routes by 2018, leaving the airport without transatlantic routes once more. In 2019, Emirates began operating daily flights to its hub at Dubai-International using its Boeing 777-300ER aircraft. The route is expected to expand to twice daily in mid-2023. Wow Air previously operated services to the airport in the final few months of operation, though Play operates the route to Keflavík presently instead. 

The COVID-19 pandemic negatively impacted the aviation industry, with Stansted Airport not being immune from the fallout. Services to Moscow-Domodedovo with Ural Airlines, Copenhagen (Scandinavian Airlines), Guernsey (Aurigny) and Mumbai and Amritsar(both Air India) Additionally, routes to Dakar with Air Senegal and Tel Aviv with El Al, which were scheduled to begin in 2020, never began operation. Additionally, easyJet, one of the largest operators at the airport at the time, announced the closure of their base at Stansted, which had more than two dozen routes and existed for more than a decade, in August 2020.

Statistics

Development
In 1988, over 1.1 million passengers passed through Stansted, the first time annual passenger numbers had exceeded 1 million at the airport. Consistent year-on-year growth followed, and by 1997, the total had reached over 5 million, rapidly rising to almost 12 million in 2000.

In 2007, passenger numbers peaked at nearly 24 million, but then declined for five years, and in 2012, the total was around 17.5 million. An increase of 2.2% was recorded in 2013 to 17.8 million passengers, then 11.7% in 2014 to 19.9 million, followed by 12.8% in 2015 to 22.5 million, and 8.0% in 2016 to a record total of 24.3 million, making Stansted the fourth-busiest airport in the United Kingdom. Stansted also is a major freight airport, the third-busiest in the UK during 2016, behind London Heathrow and East Midlands Airport, handling in excess of 223,203 tonnes per annum, although freight throughput has declined slightly from its 2005 peak level.

Passenger numbers for the year ending September 2016 increased by 8.4% to over 24 million for the first time since 2007.

Traffic figures

Busiest routes

Ground transport

Transit system

The Stansted Airport Transit System connects the terminal to the satellite buildings via a  free automated people mover service, which runs on dual concrete tracks. The system uses a mix of Adtranz C-100 and CX-100 vehicles to carry passengers to departure gates. Unlike the similar Gatwick Airport Shuttle Transit, the Stansted transit is only accessible "airside" (i.e. only after passengers pass through security).

Trains

Stansted Airport railway station is situated in the terminal building directly below the main concourse.

Services to London are on the Stansted Express train to and from London Liverpool Street in Central London. This service operates every 15 minutes and the usual journey time is between 45 and 53 minutes. Liverpool Street is served by the Central, Circle, Hammersmith & City and Metropolitan lines of the London Underground network, alongside the Elizabeth line, offering access throughout London. The Stansted Express also calls at Tottenham Hale, for the Underground's Victoria line and connections to various destinations in North London and the West End. Some Stansted Express services also call at Stansted Mountfitchet, Bishop's Stortford and/or Harlow Town en route to London Liverpool Street.

CrossCountry operates an hourly service from the airport to Birmingham New Street, via Cambridge, Peterborough and Leicester. Greater Anglia operates services to Norwich via Cambridge.

Buses and coaches
Scheduled express bus or coach services run to and from Stratford (45 minutes), Victoria Coach Station (75 minutes), Liverpool Street Station (55 minutes), and Portman Square via Golders Green (70 minutes) and Paddington Station (105 minutes) (all in London), costing about half the train fare, but taking longer. The bus station is next to the terminal building. National Express runs direct coach services to the airport from Luton Airport and Heathrow, and also from Birmingham (11 a day), Oxford (8 a day), Norwich (10 a day), and Cambridge (11 a day).

Stansted is also the start of the hourly X30 coach service to Southend-on-Sea via Chelmsford and London Southend Airport and the hourly X10 coach service to Basildon via Chelmsford, both operated by First Essex.

Local bus services operate to nearby communities, including the 510/509/508 (Harlow to Stansted via Stansted Mountfitchet, Parsonage Lane and Takeley, respectively), 7/7a (Bishops Stortford to Stansted), 133 (Braintree), and 6 (Saffron Walden), operated by Arriva.

Roads
Stansted is connected to northeast London and Cambridge by the M11 motorway and to Braintree, Colchester, and Harwich by the A120, which is dual-carriageway until Braintree.

As of October 1996, the airport has 2,500 short-stay parking spaces within walking distance to the terminal. In addition, as of the same month, the airport has over 8,000 long-stay spaces located near the M11 motorway and A120 junction. A courtesy bus service links the long-stay spaces to the terminal. The airport also offers mid-stay parking, closer to the terminal than its long-stay spaces. Stansted Airport also offers valet parking and a meet-and-greet service, which is similar to valet, but marketed more at the leisure-traveller market, both are run from the short-stay car park.

Incidents and accidents
Stansted has been designated by the UK government as its preferred airport for any hijacked planes requesting to land in the UK. This is because its design allows a hijacked airliner to be isolated well away from any terminal buildings or runways, allowing the airport to continue to operate while negotiations are carried out, or even while an assault or rescue mission is undertaken. For this reason, Stansted has been involved in more hijack incidents than might be expected for an airport of its size.
 On 27 February 1982, an Air Tanzania Boeing 737-2R8C landed at the airport after having been hijacked on an internal flight from Mwanza to Dar Es Salaam and flown to the UK via Nairobi, Jeddah, and Athens, where two passengers had been released. The hijackers demanded to speak to exiled Tanzanian opposition politician Oscar Kambona. This request was granted, and after 26 hours on the ground, the hijackers surrendered and the passengers were released.
On 30 March 1998, an Emerald Airways Hawker Siddeley HS 748 carrying the Leeds United F.C. was brought down immediately after takeoff when its starboard engine exploded. Forty passengers were onboard (18 from the Leeds team). Only two passengers were injured.
 On 22 December 1999, Korean Air Cargo Flight 8509, a Boeing 747-200F, crashed shortly after take-off from the airfield due to pilot error. The only people on board at the time were the aircrew, and all four were killed. The aircraft crashed in Hatfield Forest near the village of Great Hallingbury.
 On 6 February 2000, an Ariana Afghan Airlines Boeing 727 with 156 people on board was hijacked and flown – stopping at Tashkent, Kazakhstan, and Moscow – to Stansted Airport. After a four-day stand-off, the hostages on board were safely freed and the incident ended peacefully. It later emerged that the motive behind the hijack was to gain asylum in the UK, sparking debate about immigration into the country. A large number of passengers on board the plane also applied for asylum. The remainder returned to Afghanistan. Nine hijackers were jailed, but their convictions for hijacking were quashed for misdirection of the jury in 2003, and in July 2004, a court ruled that they could not be deported from the UK.
 On 24 May 2013, Pakistan International Airlines flight 709 from Lahore, Pakistan, was escorted by RAF Typhoons after being diverted from Manchester Airport due to an onboard threat. Two men were charged with endangering an aircraft.
 On 21 September 2013, SriLankan Airlines flight UL503 inbound to Heathrow was escorted by RAF Typhoons to Stansted Airport after being diverted. Two men were detained for endangering an aircraft, one was formally arrested.
 On 4 October 2017, RAF Typhoons from the Quick Reaction Alert intercepted Ryanair flight FR2145 inbound to Luton and escorted it to Stansted Airport after a bomb threat. The threat was found to be a hoax.
 On 12 October 2022, Jet2 flight LS922 from Dalaman, Turkey, was escorted by RAF Typhoons after being diverted from Manchester Airport due to a security scare.
 On 4 March 2023, a Dash-8 flight from Iceland to Kenya via London Southend was escorted by RAF Typhoons from the Quick Reaction Alert into Stansted. The aircraft later continued on to Kenya.

See also
 List of airports in the United Kingdom and the British Crown Dependencies
 Airports of London
 List of Royal Air Force stations

References

Citations

Bibliography
 Freeman, Roger A. (1994) UK Airfields of the Ninth: Then and Now. After the Battle 
 Maurer, Maurer (1983). Air Force Combat Units Of World War II. Maxwell AFB, Alabama: Office of Air Force History. .#
 USAAS-USAAC-USAAF-USAF Aircraft Serial Numbers—1908 to present
 The Bishop's Stortford Herald newspaper, 26 April 2007.

External links
 
 
 

 
Airports in Essex
Airports in the London region
Airports in the East of England
Heathrow Airport Holdings
Airports established in 1943
Ove Arup buildings and structures
Foster and Partners buildings
Lattice shell structures
Transport in Uttlesford
Proposed transport infrastructure in the East of England
1943 establishments in England
Manchester Airports Group
Stansted Mountfitchet
Takeley
Elsenham
Civilian airports with RAF origins